Wycliffe Otieno Onyango is Kenyan defender who features for Kenyan Premier League side Nairobi City Stars.

Career
Wycliffe formerly turned out for Kenya School of Law, Nairobi Stima and FC Kariobangi Sharks before joining Nairobi City Stars in July 2019.

He stayed on after the team's promotion to the Premier League, and added one more season to feature in the 2021-22 FKF PL.

Honours

Club
Kariobangi Sharks
National Super League
 Runners-up (1): 2017
GOtv Shield
 Runners-up (1): 2017
 Champions (1): 2018
Nairobi City Stars
National Super League
 Champions (1): 2019-20

References

External links

1989 births
Living people
Kenyan footballers
Nairobi City Stars players
F.C. Kariobangi Sharks players
Kenyan Premier League players